In New Zealand, the Leader of the Opposition (or Opposition leader) is a senior politician who leads the Official Opposition. The Leader of the Opposition is, by convention, the leader of the largest political party in the House of Representatives that is not in government (nor provides confidence and supply). This is usually the parliamentary leader of the second-largest caucus in the House of Representatives.

When in the debating chamber the Opposition leader sits on the left-hand side of the centre table, in front of the Opposition and opposite the prime minister.

The role of the leader of the Opposition dates to the late 19th century, with the first political parties, and the office was formally recognised by statute in 1933. Although currently mentioned in a number of statutes, the office is not established by any Act (nor is that of the prime minister); it is simply a product of the conventions of the Westminster-style parliamentary system. The leader of the Opposition is paid a special salary by virtue of the office.

Typically the leader is elected by his or her party according to its rules. A new leader may be elected when the incumbent dies, resigns, or is challenged for the leadership. On 30 November 2021 Christopher Luxon was voted Leader of the National Party and Leader of the Opposition 

Since 1936, the leader of the Opposition has invariably come from either the Labour or National parties.

Role

The term "opposition" has a specific meaning in the parliamentary sense; it is an important component of the Westminster system, with the Official Opposition directing criticism at the Government. The leader of the Opposition chairs a Shadow Cabinet, which scrutinises the policies and actions of the Cabinet led by the prime minister, and promotes alternative policies. Directed by the leader, the Opposition may move no-confidence motions to test the Government's majority or the confidence of the House. The leader of the Opposition may be asked by the governor-general form a new government if the incumbent government is unable to continue in office (e.g. upon a successful no-confidence motion).

Apart from parliamentary duties, there are several ways in which the leader of the Opposition participates directly in affairs of state. Often, these relate to national security matters, which are supposed to transcend party politics – the New Zealand Security Intelligence Service, for example, is required to brief the leader of the Opposition as well as the prime minister on certain matters of national security.

Salary
The leader of the Opposition receives a higher salary than other members of the Opposition, being paid the same amount as a Cabinet minister.  the Leader of the Opposition's salary is NZ$288,900. In addition, like all other members of parliament, the leader of the Opposition receives annual allowances for travel and lodging.

History
For much of the country's early history, the role was not a formal one. For most of the 19th century, there was rarely any one person who could be identified as the leader of the Opposition. Prominent members were sometimes informally dubbed as "Leader of the Opposition" – often facetiously by rival politicians. It was only when the Liberal Party was formed that any unified leadership appeared in Parliament, and the role of Opposition leader is generally traced from this point. John Ballance, leader of the Liberals (and later premier) is usually considered the first leader of the Opposition in the modern sense.

When Ballance led the Liberals into government in 1891, they faced no formal opposition in a party sense, though certain MPs were styled leader of the Opposition. Their opponents gradually coalesced around a leader, William Massey, who became Opposition leader in 1903, and in 1909 became the first parliamentary leader of the new Reform Party. For the first time, an Opposition party came forward as an alternative government. After this, the leader of the Opposition was typically the parliamentary leader of the largest party in the House of Representatives that had not undertaken to support the government of the day.

One exception to this was during World War I, when the opposition Liberal Party accepted the governing Reform Party's offer to form a wartime coalition. Prime Minister Massey also extended the offer to the new Labour Party who rejected it. This made Labour the largest party not in government, however their leader Alfred Hindmarsh was not officially recognised as the leader of the Opposition. Joseph Ward, who became deputy prime minister in the wartime cabinet, still retained the title, albeit in name only.

During the 1910s and 1920s, the role of Official Opposition alternated between the Liberal and Reform parties. However, the rise of the Labour Party in the 1920s, together with a gradual weakening in support for the Liberals, led to a three-party situation by the mid-1920s, with the Labour and Liberal parties having a similar number of seats. After the 1925 election there was no official leader of the Opposition until Rex Mason of Labour won the seat of Eden in the by-election held on 15 April 1926. Labour superseded the Liberals as the Official Opposition, and their leader Harry Holland became the leader of the Opposition.

The 1928 general election put the United Party (a remnant of the Liberals) in government for the last time. Reform then became the Opposition, however in 1931 Reform entered into coalition with the Liberals, and Labour then became the Official Opposition, despite being the third party. The unity of the coalition, culminating in the formation of the National Party in 1936, created a stable two-party system, with National and Labour alternating between Government and Opposition for much of the remainder of the century.

Modern office
The office was first officially recognised by an Act of Parliament in 1933, when a special allowance was conferred on the holder.

With the introduction of the mixed-member proportional (MMP) voting system, first used in the 1996 general election, the nature of parliamentary opposition has changed. Now, though the leader of the largest non-Government party still becomes the leader of the Opposition, there will usually be several parties who are "in opposition". An example of this arose after the 2002 general election, when the National Party gained only 27 seats – less than half the 58 seats held by opposition parties. This prompted calls from a number of parties, notably New Zealand First and the Greens, for the abolition or reform of the post. It was argued by these parties that the position had become an "anachronism" in the modern multi-party environment, and that the days of a united opposition bloc were gone. However, with the revival of the National Party in the 2005 general election, a more traditional relationship between Government and Opposition has been restored. According to Parliamentary Services, the leader of the Opposition formally represents and speaks for all parties that are outside Government.

List of leaders of the Opposition
A table of leaders is below. Those who also served as prime minister, either before or after being leader of the Opposition, are indicated.

Key

Notes

See also

List of prime ministers of New Zealand

References

External links

People of Parliament – New Zealand Parliament

Public office-holders in New Zealand
Opposition
Main|New Zealand
New Zealand
Lists of political office-holders in New Zealand